Lupososhi District is a district of Northern Province, Zambia. It was created in 2018 by splitting Luwingu District.

References 

Districts of Northern Province, Zambia